Julia Benneckenstein (born 8 March 2000) is a Liechtensteiner footballer who plays as a midfielder for Wil and the Liechtenstein national football team.

Career statistics

International

References

2000 births
Living people
Women's association football midfielders
Liechtenstein women's international footballers
Liechtenstein women's footballers